Claudiu Florin Juncănaru (born 18 February 1996) is a Romanian professional footballer who plays as a midfielder for Liga III side CSM Focșani.

Honours
Turris Turnu Măgurele
Liga III: 2018–19

References

External links
 

1996 births
Living people
Romanian footballers
Association football midfielders
Liga I players
Liga II players
FC Botoșani players
FCV Farul Constanța players
AFC Turris-Oltul Turnu Măgurele players
CSM Focșani players